An Innocent Love is a 1982 American made-for-television coming-of-age film directed by Roger Young, starring Melissa Sue Anderson and Doug McKeon.

Plot 
Harry Woodward (Doug McKeon) is a gifted 14-year-old mathematician who is studying at the University of Washington. He becomes the tutor of 19-year-old Molly Rush (Melissa Sue Anderson), who entered the university on a volleyball scholarship and is trying to raise her GPA in order to transfer to UCLA. Harry soon develops a crush on her, but she is dating jock Duncan Widders (Steven Bauer). In the process of tutoring her, Harry comes of age, dealing with many first obstacles such as his first crush, overbearing parents, enrolling his first sports, among others.

Cast
Melissa Sue Anderson as Molly Rush
Doug McKeon as Harry Woodward
Steven Bauer as Duncan Widders
Kristoff St. John as Mario
Bill Calvert as Max
Kendall Kay Munsey as Beatrice
Pat Finley as June Woodward
John Colenback as Andrew Woodward

Reception
The reviewer of The New York Times called An Innocent Love "a very down-to-earth, engaging television movie. [..] Miss Anderson plays Molly sweetly and sturdily, but this is mostly Mr. McKeon's show."

References

External links

1982 television films
1982 films
American romance films
CBS network films
Films scored by David Michael Frank
Films set in universities and colleges
Films set in Washington (state)
1980s English-language films
Films directed by Roger Young
1980s American films